The first season of The Real Housewives of New Jersey, an American reality television series, was broadcast on Bravo. It aired from May 12, 2009 until July 9, 2009, and was primarily filmed in Franklin Lakes, New Jersey. Its executive producers are Rebecca Toth Diefenbach, Valerie Haselton, Lucilla D'Agostino, Jim Fraenkel, Omid Kahangi, Caroline Self, Tess Gamboa Meyers and Andy Cohen.

The Real Housewives of New Jersey focuses on the lives of Teresa Giudice, Jacqueline Laurita, Caroline Manzo, Dina Manzo and Danielle Staub. It consisted of eight episodes, all of which aired on Tuesday evenings.

Production and crew
The Real Housewives of New Jersey was first announced when Bravo released its 2008–09 programming on April 15, 2008. It was later announced that the series would debut on May 12, 2009, the first series to feature family members. Dina and Tommy Manzo would later end up separated. The season premiere "Thicker Than Water" was aired on May 12, 2009, while the seventh episode "The Last Supper" served as the season finale, and was aired on June 18, 2009. It was followed by a two-part reunion special, and a lost footage episode which marked the conclusion of the season and was broadcast on November July 9, 2009. Rebecca Toth Diefenbach, Valerie Haselton, Lucilla D'Agostino, Jim Fraenkel, Omid Kahangi, Caroline Self, Tess Gamboa Meyers and Andy Cohen are recognized as the series' executive producers; it is produced and distributed by Sirens Media.

Cast and synopsis

Five housewives were featured during the first season of The Real Housewives of New Jersey, which Bravo described as "the most affluent and drama-filled women in the Garden State." The series was the first Real Housewives installment to feature family, sisters Caroline and Dina are married to brothers Albert and Tommy Manzo, and Jacqueline Laurita is married to Caroline and Dina's brother, Chris Laurita. Fellow series regular Teresa Giudice had been friends with both Manzos and Laurita for years prior to the series and Danielle Staub, who was also a series regular, was introduced to the group through Jacqueline.

Episodes

References

External links

2009 American television seasons
New Jersey (season 1)